Jo Alexander Koppang (born 10 July 1988) is a Norwegian luger. He was born in Oslo. He competed at the 2014 Winter Olympics in Sochi, where he placed 34th in the men's singles.

References

External links

1988 births
Living people
Sportspeople from Oslo
Lugers at the 2014 Winter Olympics
Norwegian male lugers
Olympic lugers of Norway